The Transformers: All Hail Megatron was a story arc in The Transformers from IDW Publishing.

Summary

References

External links
IDW Publishing Catalogue

All Hail Megatron